Lavender Woman was a lesbian periodical produced in Chicago, Illinois, from 1971 to 1976. There were 26 issues, published irregularly. Lavender Woman was a collaborative newspaper aimed at voicing the concerns of many in the lesbian community, and also to be an outlet for those concerns. The strive for inclusiveness was important to the lesbian community as a way to combat their feelings of exclusion from the mainstream feminist movement. The paper took submissions from the public and included letters, articles, poetry, photos, drawings, and advertisements.

History 
In November 1971, Lavender Woman began as a segment of the larger paper The Feminist Voice, written by members of the Women's Caucus of Chicago Gay Alliance. The first issue of The Feminist Voice was published in August and in only four months Lavender Woman became its own publication. Different women contributed to each issue and, on the second page of each, the contributors' names were listed. Allowing different women to contribute to each issue was a way to include many different lesbian voices and lesbian works in the magazine. It was their hope to include as many of these submissions as they could. Lavender Woman referred to these submissions as "bits of themselves" affirming that the art, writing, photos, etc., being shared were personal to those who chose to share their experiences.

The final edition 

The last edition of the Lavender Woman was published in July 1976, titled "WE QUIT." It cited four reasons for the end of the newspaper:

 The staff of the Lavender Woman had dwindled down to four main editors, two of whom were soon moving away from Chicago and would no longer be able to work on the paper.

 A feeling of disconnect from the community.

The paper consumed too much time and energy, and took too long to get done.
 There was a loss of interest and a feeling of boredom over the topics of the paper.

Archives 
One of the physical archives of the Lavender Woman periodical was originally owned by the Atlanta Lesbian Feminist Alliance. When that group dissolved in 1994 it was sold to Duke University. The University of Michigan Joseph A. Labadie Collection has an incomplete archive of Lavender Woman, having all but five of the 26 total issues. Digital archives can be accessed on the Duke Digital Collection and on An Open Access Collection of an Alternative Press, Independent Voices.

Importance 
Responses to Lavender Woman convey the importance of lesbian publications during a time where the lesbian community was feeling excluded from many different facets of life, such as feminism, their families and society at large. Overall, the feedback consisted of gratitude for the publishing of the paper, and for how the newspaper helped readers to feel less alone in their lives.

Controversy 
When the Chicago Lesbian Liberation group split from Lavender Woman, it published its own newsletter from 1973 to 1974. Lavender Woman canceled the Chicago Lesbian Liberation's one-page space over a controversial cartoon. In response, the Chicago Lesbian Liberation published two issues of The Original Lavender Woman in September and October 1974, claiming it was the new Lavender Woman collective and even going so far as to tell their distributors they were the Lavender Woman and replacing issues with their own publication. The result was the first significant division in the lesbian periodical publishing community.

See also 
 List of lesbian periodicals in the United States
 Lesbian feminism
 Lesbian literature

External links 

 Complete digital archive

References

1971 establishments in Illinois
1976 disestablishments in Illinois
Lesbian culture in Illinois
Lesbian feminist mass media
LGBT culture in Chicago
Defunct newspapers published in Chicago
LGBT-related newspapers published in the United States
Feminist newspapers
Women in Illinois
Inductees of the Chicago LGBT Hall of Fame